The Chamber of Commerce is the national chamber of commerce of Mauritania. It is located in Nouakchott, northwest of Mosque Ould Abas and just south of the Central Bank of Mauritania.

References

Nouakchott
Government of Mauritania